Béla Szabados may refer to:

Béla Szabados (composer) (1867–1936), Hungarian composer
Béla Szabados (swimmer) (born 1974), Hungarian Olympic swimmer